Dura al-Qar' or Dura al-Qari'a is a Palestinian town in the central West Bank, part of the Ramallah and al-Bireh Governorate. According to the Palestinian Central Bureau of Statistics, Dura al-Qar' had a population of 2,897 inhabitants in 2007.

The town's total land area is 4,016 dunams, of which 2,891 dunams have been appropriated by Israel mostly for the purpose of building a by-pass road. According to Dura al-Qar's village council, 142 families have been directly affected by the confiscations and 58% of the town's population depend on those lands as main sources of income.

Location
It is bordered by Ein Yabrud   to the east, Ein Siniya  to the north, Jifna, Al-Jalazun Camp and Surda to the west, and Al Bireh  to the south.

History
Potsherds from the  Roman and  Roman/Byzantine era have been found in the village.

Ottoman era
Potsherds from the early Ottoman era have been found here.

In 1838, it was noted as a Muslim village, Durah, in the Beni Harit district, north of Jerusalem.

In 1863 Victor Guérin found the village to have 250 inhabitants. He further described that old oaks shaded for  ancient springs, which were used to irrigate the fields. Several houses in the village were built, at least in part, with ancient stones. An Ottoman village list from about 1870 found that the village had a population of 120, in 22  houses, though the population count only included men.

In 1882, the PEF's Survey of Western Palestine (SWP) described Durah as "a small village on the side of a valley, with springs on the south, and olives".
In 1907, it was described as "a small, healthfully located Moslem village. Its inhabitants have a good reputation for peaceful relations with the Jifna Christians. The Durah people raise many vegetables."

In 1896 the population of Dura el-kara was estimated to be about 246 persons.

British Mandate era
In the 1922 census of Palestine, conducted by the British Mandate authorities, Dura el Qare''' had a population of 191, all Muslims,  increasing in the 1931 census to 303, still all Muslims, in a total of 71 houses.

In the 1945 statistics the population was 370, all Muslims, while the total land area was 4,166 dunams, according to an official land and population survey. Of  this, 1,762 were allocated  for plantations and irrigable land, 1,253 for cereals, while 18 dunams were classified as built-up areas.

Jordanian era
In the wake of the 1948 Arab–Israeli War, and after the 1949 Armistice Agreements, Dura al-Qar' came under Jordanian rule.

The Jordanian census of 1961 found 576 inhabitants in Dura Qar'''.

1967 and after
Since the Six-Day War in 1967, Dura al-Qar' has been under Israeli occupation.

After the 1995 accords, 23.3% of the village‟s total area has been classified as Area B land, while the remaining 76.7% is classified as Area C. Israel has “confiscated” 680 dunum of village land for constructing the Israeli settlement of Beit El.

On August 14, 1995, Kheir Abdel Hafid Qassem, a 24-year-old Palestinian man, was shot dead by an Israeli settler from Beit El, and many people were arrested, while he and about a 100 other residents of Dura al-Qar' were attempting to drive away settlers by tearing down Israeli canvas shelters and cinder-block buildings outside of the village.

Notable people
Rabiha Diab (1954–2016)

References

Bibliography

External links
Welcome To Dura al-Qari'
Survey of Western Palestine, Map 14:  IAA,  Wikimedia commons  
Dura el Qar’ Village (Fact Sheet),  Applied Research Institute–Jerusalem (ARIJ)
 Dura el Qar’ Village Profile, ARIJ
 Dura el Qar’  aerial photo, ARIJ
 Locality Development Priorities and Needs in Dura el Qar’ Village, ARIJ

Villages in the West Bank
Ramallah and al-Bireh Governorate
Municipalities of the State of Palestine